The Strange Affliction of Anton Bruckner is a 1990 film directed by Ken Russell. It is a biography of Anton Bruckner.

The Guardian called it "charming".

References

External links

The Strange Affliction of Anton Bruckner at BFI
The Strange Affliction of Anton Bruchner at Letterbox DVD

1990 films
British television films
1990 drama films
Films directed by Ken Russell
1990s English-language films